The Forest Home (also known as the Absalom L. Davis House) is a historic residence near Trinity, Alabama.  The house was built in 1856 on land given to him upon his father-in-law's death.  Davis was a farmer, a teacher at LaGrange College (today known as the University of North Alabama), and a leader of the Grange movement of farmer advocacy.  The house remained in the Davis family as a working cotton farm until 1973.  The house is a two-story I-house with a single-story rear ell.  A two-story porch adorns the front façade.  The house was listed on the Alabama Register of Landmarks and Heritage in 1979 and the National Register of Historic Places in 1980.

References

National Register of Historic Places in Morgan County, Alabama
Houses on the National Register of Historic Places in Alabama
Victorian architecture in Alabama
Houses completed in 1856
Houses in Morgan County, Alabama
Properties on the Alabama Register of Landmarks and Heritage